The Traveller is an Egyptian film directed by Ahmed Maher. The story takes place in the course of three days of the life of Hassan, the octogenarian protagonist, played by Khaled El Nabawy as the young Hassan and Omar Sharif as the older Hassan. The three days of Hassan's life represents key events in modern Egyptian history: the first is the Nakba in 1948, the second is the 6 October War in 1973, and the third is 9/11 in 2001.

Cast
The characters of the film were portrayed by famous Egyptian actors including:

 Omar Sharif
 Khaled El Nabawy
 Amr Waked
 Cyrine Abdelnour
 Sherif Ramzy
 Basma
 Alaa Morsy

Plot summary

Three crucial days in a Hassan's life. First day. Autumn 1948, Port Said, Hassan's first day at work when he receives a telegram and decides to meet the beautiful and thrill-loving Nura by impersonating her long-distant fiancé. Hassan manages both to reach the cruise ship on which she is travelling and to charm her, until he impatiently rapes her and then accidentally sets the ship on fire. Second Day. Autumn 1973. Alexandria of Egypt. Hassan is in the city to meet Nadia, Nura's daughter, who is mourning her brother who has just died in a seaside accident. Hassan soon comes to believe he is Nadia's father, and helps engineer her marriage to a halfwit hanger-on. Third Day. Autumn 2001, Cairo. Hassan meets Alì, Nadia's son where he observes numerous similarities with the young man.

References

External links 
 
  The Traveller at the 66th Venice Film Festival 
 
 

2009 films
2000s Arabic-language films
Egyptian drama films